Dagmar Holst (born 29 November 1942) is a retired German rower for East Germany who won a gold, a silver and a bronze medal in the quadruple sculls at the European Rowing Championships of 1966, 1968 and 1969, respectively.

After marrying in 1968–1969, Holst competed as Dagmar Seipt or Dagmar Seipt-Holst.

References

Living people
East German female rowers
European Rowing Championships medalists
1942 births